The Western Border Football League is an Australian rules football competition based in the Lower South East region of South Australia, and south-western border region of Victoria.  It is an affiliated member of the South Australian National Football League. The league used to be regarded as the premier country football league in South Australia, and a leading country Victorian league, however the number of clubs and standard has declined in recent years.

Brief history 
In 1964, after almost a decade of discussions, the Western District Football League in Victoria and the South-East & Border Football League in South Australia merged to form the Western Border Football League. The founding 12 clubs were Casterton, Coleraine, East Gambier, Hamilton, Hamilton Imperials, Heywood, Millicent, North Gambier, Penola, Portland, South Gambier and West Gambier.

Hamilton and Millicent both had jumpers similar to 's, so an agreement was made that the team that finished lower on the ladder for 1964 had to change jumpers. Hamilton finished ninth, while Millicent finished 11th of 12, so Millicent was forced to change to the  strip.

Penola left and joined the Kowree-Naracoorte Football League in 1988; Coleraine left and joined the South West District Football League in 1995.

In 2011, the Heywood Football Club left the Western Border Football League due to the club struggling to compete with the larger town clubs in the league. Their first application to leave was rejected, so they were forced to go to higher levels at the VCFL to resolve issues between the League and the Heywood Football Netball Club.

In 2012, the Hamilton and Hamilton Imperials club merged upon recommendation from the VCFL and competed in the Hampden Football Netball League from 2013. Portland also transferred to the Hampden Football Netball League for 2013, leaving just 6 teams in the competition today.
Casterton merged with neighbouring club Sandford (from the South West District Football League) in 2014.

Some famous players that have played in the Western Border Football League have been Billy Picken, Matthew Clarke, Nick Daffy, Nathan Lovett-Murray, Mal Michael, John Mossop, Wally Lovett.

Clubs

Current

 Notes

Former

Timeline

Notable WBFL Players

John Gill, Barry Gill, Max Rooke, Alan Richardson, Russell Johnston, Don Whitten, Laurie Nash, Reg Burgess, David Robbie Casterton - Sandford
Brian Gray, Les Kaine, John Vickery, Eric Moore, Barry McKenzie, Michael Horsburgh Coleraine
Gary Lazarus, Simon Feast, Stephen Jankowicz East Gambier
Phil Walsh, Alan Atkinson, Paul Cranage, Tony Russell, Shannon Watt, Adam Campbell, Marcus Picken, Liam Picken Hamilton
Ian Ridley, John McMillan, Mark Orval, Josh Thurgood, Hamilton Imperials
Denis Zeunert, Billy Picken, Wally Lovett, Justin Perkins, Nathan Lovett-Murray, Mal Michael, Courtney Johns, Justin Perkins Heywood
Bob Clifford, Brian Roberts, Neil Sutherland, Mason Redman, Richard Nixon Andrew Nitschke, Triple League medalist — Millicent
Nick Daffy, Dwaine Kretschmer, Glen Keast, Lucas Herbert North Gambier
John Mossop, Michael Graham, Colin Graham, Penola
Stuart Spencer, Clyde Laidlaw, Peter Hogan, Leo King, Wayne Blackwell, Ian Hampshire, Winis Imbi, Brodie Atkinson, Portland
Max James, Doug Long, Robin McKinnon, Nathan Stark - South Gambier
John Yeates, Mark Yeates, Jason Walscgott, Tim O'Brien, Matthew Clarke, Robin White West Gambier

Bibliography
 Encyclopedia of South Australian country football clubs compiled by Peter Lines. 
 South Australian country football digest by Peter Lines

References

External links
 
 Fixtures and results on PlayHQ

 
Australian rules football competitions in South Australia
Australian rules football competitions in Victoria (Australia)